MV Seaforth was an Elder Dempster Lines cargo motor ship that traded between Liverpool and West Africa. She was launched in 1938 in Scotland and sunk in 1941 in the North Atlantic.

Building
Caledon Shipbuilding & Engineering Company built Seaforth at its Stannergate yard in Dundee, launching her on 22 November 1938 and completing her in February 1939. William Doxford & Sons of Sunderland made her engine, which was a four-cylinder, single-acting two-stroke diesel rated at 598 NHP or 3,100 bhp.

Seaforth was the first of three sister ships. Sansu and Sangara were launched in 1939 by Scotts Shipbuilding and Engineering Company in Greenock. They differed from Seaforth by having six-cylinder MAN diesel engines that Scotts built under licence.

Service
Seaforths trade was general cargo to West Africa and West African produce to Liverpool.

The Second World War began less than seven months after she entered service. From October 1939 until November 1940 she sailed in OB convoys outbound from Liverpool to the North Atlantic and SL convoys from Freetown in Sierra Leone to Liverpool. Her ports of call included Douala in Cameroon in October 1939 and Funchal in Madeira in February 1940.

After November 1940 Seaforth sailed unescorted.

Loss
Early in 1941 Seaforth sailed from Liverpool to West Africa. On her return voyage she was carrying nine or ten passengers bound for Liverpool.

The  sighted Seaforth in a heavy sea at 1355 hrs on 18 February. The u-boat did not attack until after sunset, at 2130 hrs, when she fired a torpedo that missed. Seaforth transmitted a wireless distress message stating that a u-boat was attacking her.

At 2133 hrs U-103 fired a second torpedo, which hit Seaforth amidships. Seaforths crew launched her lifeboats. At 2150 hrs U-103 fired a third torpedo, which hit Seaforth in the stern. She sank quickly thereafter. No survivors were ever found.

Sources disagree as to the position where U-103 sank Seaforth.

References

Bibliography

1938 ships
Maritime incidents in February 1941
Ships built in Dundee
Ships lost with all hands
Ships sunk by German submarines in World War II
World War II merchant ships of the United Kingdom
World War II shipwrecks in the Atlantic Ocean